Identity politics is a political approach wherein people of a particular race, nationality, religion, gender, sexual orientation, social background, social class, or other identifying factors develop political agendas that are based upon these identities. Identity politics is deeply connected with the idea that some groups in society are oppressed and begins with analysis of that oppression. The term is used primarily to describe political movements in western societies, covering nationalist, multicultural, women's rights, civil rights, and LGBT movements. Depending on which definition of identity politics is assumed, the term could also encompass other social phenomena which are not commonly understood as exemplifying identity politics, such as governmental migration policy that regulates mobility based on identities, or far-right nationalist agendas of exclusion of national or ethnic others. For this reason, Kurzwelly, Pérez and Spiegel, who discuss several possible definitions of the term, argue that it is an analytically imprecise concept. 

The term "identity politics" dates to the late twentieth century, although it had precursors in the writings of individuals such as Mary Wollstonecraft and Frantz Fanon. Many contemporary advocates of identity politics take an intersectional perspective, which accounts for the range of interacting systems of oppression that may affect their lives and come from their various identities. According to many who describe themselves as advocates of identity politics, it centers the lived experiences of those facing systemic oppression; the purpose is to better understand the interplay of racial, economic, sex-based, and gender-based oppression (among others) and to ensure no one group is disproportionately affected by political actions, present and future. Such contemporary applications of identity politics describe people of specific race, ethnicity, sex, gender identity, sexual orientation, age, economic class, disability status, education, religion, language, profession, political party, veteran status, recovery status, and geographic location. These identity labels are not mutually exclusive but are in many cases compounded into one when describing hyper-specific groups. An example is that of African-American, homosexual, women, who constitute a particular hyper-specific identity class. Those who take an intersectional perspective, such as Kimberlé Crenshaw, criticise narrower forms of identity politics which overemphasise inter-group differences and ignore intra-group differences and forms of oppression.

Criticisms of identity politics generally come from either the centre-right or the far-left on the political spectrum. Many socialists and ideological Marxists have deeply criticized identity politics for its divisive nature, claiming that it forms identities that can undermine proletariat unity and the class struggle as a whole. On the other hand, many conservative think tanks and media outlets have criticized identity politics for other reasons, claiming that it is inherently collectivist and prejudicial. Right-wing critics of identity politics have seen it as particularist, in contrast to the universalism of liberal or Marxist perspectives, or argue that it detracts attention from non-identity based structures of oppression and exploitation. A leftist critique of identity politics, such as that of Nancy Fraser, points out that political mobilization based on identitarian affirmation leads to surface redistribution - a redistribution within the existing structure and existing relations of production that does not challenge the status quo. Instead, Fraser argued, identitarian deconstruction, rather than affirmation, is more conducive to a leftist politics of economic redistribution. Other critiques, such as that of Kurzwelly, Rapport and Spiegel, point out that identity politics often leads to reproduction and reification of essentialist notions of identity, notions which are inherently erroneous.

Terminology 
During the late 1970s, increasing numbers of women—namely Jewish women, women of color, and lesbians—criticized the assumption of a common "woman's experience" irrespective of unique differences in race, ethnicity, class, sexuality, and culture. The term "identity politics" was coined by the Combahee River Collective in 1977. The collective group of women saw identity politics as an analysis that introduced opportunity for Black women to be actively involved in politics, while simultaneously acting as a tool to authenticate Black women's personal experiences. In the ensuing decades, it has been employed in myriad cases with different connotations dependent upon the term's context. It subsequently gained currency with the emergence of social activism, manifesting in various dialogues within the feminist, American civil rights, and LGBT movements, as well as multiple nationalist and postcolonial organizations.

In academic usage, the term identity politics refers to a wide range of political activities and theoretical analyses rooted in experiences of injustice shared by different, often excluded social groups. In this context, identity politics aims to reclaim greater self-determination and political freedom for marginalized peoples through understanding particular paradigms and lifestyle factors, and challenging externally imposed characterizations and limitations, instead of organizing solely around status quo belief systems or traditional party affiliations. Identity is used "as a tool to frame political claims, promote political ideologies, or stimulate and orient social and political action, usually in a larger context of inequality or injustice and with the aim of asserting group distinctiveness and belonging and gaining power and recognition."

History 
The term identity politics may have been used in political discourse since at least the 1970s. The first known written appearance of the term is found in the April 1977 statement of the Black feminist socialist group, Combahee River Collective, which was originally printed in 1979's Capitalist Patriarchy and the Case for Socialist Feminism, later in Home Girls: A Black Feminist Anthology, edited by Barbara Smith, a founding member of the Collective, who have been credited with coining the term. In their terminal statement, they said:

Identity politics, as a mode of categorizing, are closely connected to the ascription that some social groups are oppressed (such as women, ethnic minorities, and sexual minorities); that is, the idea that individuals belonging to those groups are, by virtue of their identity, more vulnerable to forms of oppression such as cultural imperialism, violence, exploitation of labour, marginalization, or subjugation. Therefore, these lines of social difference can be seen as ways to gain empowerment or avenues through which to work towards a more equal society. In the United States, identity politics is usually ascribed to these oppressed minority groups who are fighting discrimination. In Canada and Spain, identity politics has been used to describe separatist movements; in Africa, Asia, and eastern Europe, it has described violent nationalist and ethnic conflicts. Overall, in Europe, identity politics are exclusionary and based on the idea that the silent majority needs to be protected from globalization and immigration.

During the 1980s, the politics of identity became very prominent and it was also linked to a new wave of social movement activism.

Debates and criticism

Nature of the movement
The term identity politics has been applied retroactively to varying movements that long predate its coinage. Historian Arthur Schlesinger Jr. discussed identity politics extensively in his 1991 book The Disuniting of America. Schlesinger, a strong supporter of liberal conceptions of civil rights, argues that a liberal democracy requires a common basis for culture and society to function. Rather than seeing civil society as already fractured along lines of power and powerlessness (according to race, ethnicity, sexuality, etc.), Schlesinger suggests that basing politics on group marginalization is itself what fractures the civil polity, and that identity politics therefore works against creating real opportunities for ending marginalization. Schlesinger believes that "movements for civil rights should aim toward full acceptance and integration of marginalized groups into the mainstream culture, rather than … perpetuating that marginalization through affirmations of difference."

Brendan O'Neill has suggested that identity politics causes (rather than simply recognizing and acting on) political schisms along lines of social identity. Thus, he contrasts the politics of gay liberation and identity politics by saying: "[Peter] Tatchell also had, back in the day, … a commitment to the politics of liberation, which encouraged gays to come out and live and engage. Now, we have the politics of identity, which invites people to stay in, to look inward, to obsess over the body and the self, to surround themselves with a moral forcefield to protect their worldview—which has nothing to do with the world—from any questioning."

Similarly in the United Kingdom, author Owen Jones argues that identity politics often marginalize the working class, saying:

LGBT issues

The gay liberation movement of the late 1960s through the mid-1980s urged lesbians and gay men to engage in radical direct action, and to counter societal shame with gay pride. In the feminist spirit of the personal being political, the most basic form of activism was an emphasis on coming out to family, friends and colleagues, and living life as an openly lesbian or gay person. While the 1970s were the peak of "gay liberation" in New York City and other urban areas in the United States, "gay liberation" was the term still used instead of "gay pride" in more oppressive areas into the mid-1980s, with some organizations opting for the more inclusive, "lesbian and gay liberation". While women and transgender activists had lobbied for more inclusive names from the beginning of the movement, the initialism LGBT, or "Queer" as a counterculture shorthand for LGBT, did not gain much acceptance as an umbrella term until much later in the 1980s, and in some areas not until the '90s or even '00s. During this period in the United States, identity politics were largely seen in these communities in the definitions espoused by writers such as self-identified, "black, dyke, feminist, poet, mother" Audre Lorde's view, that lived experience matters, defines us, and is the only thing that grants authority to speak on these topics; that, "If I didn't define myself for myself, I would be crunched into other people's fantasies for me and eaten alive."

By the 2000s, in some areas of queer studies (notably those around gender) the idea of "identity politics" began to shift away from that of naming and claiming lived experience, and authority arising from lived experience, to one emphasizing choice and performance. Some who draw on the work of authors like Judith Butler particularly stress this concept of remaking and unmaking performative identities. Writers in the field of Queer theory have at times taken this to the extent as to now argue that "queer", despite generations of specific use to describe a "non-heterosexual" sexual orientation, no longer needs to refer to any specific sexual orientation at all; that it is now only about "disrupting the mainstream", with author David M. Halperin arguing that straight people may now also self-identify as "queer". However, many LGBT people believe this concept of "queer heterosexuality" is an oxymoron and offensive form of cultural appropriation which not only robs gays and lesbians of their identities, but makes invisible and irrelevant the actual, lived experience of oppression that causes them to be marginalized in the first place. "It desexualizes identity, when the issue is precisely about a sexual identity."

Some supporters of identity politics take stances based on Gayatri Chakravorty Spivak's work (namely, "Can the Subaltern Speak?") and have described some forms of identity politics as strategic essentialism, a form which has sought to work with hegemonic discourses to reform the understanding of "universal" goals. Others point out the erroneous logic and the ultimate dangers of reproducing strong identitarian divisions inherent in essentialism.

Critique of identity politics

"Divide and rule" 
Critics argue that groups based on a particular shared identity (e.g. race, or gender identity) can divert energy and attention from more fundamental issues, similar to the history of divide and rule strategies.

In response to the formulations of the Combahee River Collective that necessitated the organization of women around intersectional identities to bring about broader social change, socialist and radical feminists insisted that, instead, activism would require support for more "basic" forms of oppression. Other feminists also mirrored this sentiment, implying that a politics of issues should supersede a politics of identity. Tarrow also asserts that identity politics can produce insular, sectarian, and divisive movements incapable of expanding membership, broadening appeals, and negotiating with prospective allies. In other words, separate organization undermines movement identity, distracts activists from important issues, and prevents the creation of a common agenda.

Socialist critique 
Those who criticize identity politics from the right see it as inherently collectivist and prejudicial, in contradiction to the ideals of classical liberalism. Those who criticize identity politics from the left, such as Marxists and Marxist–Leninists, see identity politics as a version of bourgeois nationalism, i.e. as a divide and conquer strategy by the ruling classes to divide people by nationality, race, ethnicity, religion, etc. so as to distract the working class from uniting for the purpose of class struggle and proletarian revolution.

Sociologist Charles Derber asserts that the American left is "largely an identity-politics party" and that it "offers no broad critique of the political economy of capitalism. It focuses on reforms for Blacks and women and so forth. But it doesn't offer a contextual analysis within capitalism." Both he and David North of the Socialist Equality Party posit that these fragmented and isolated identity movements which permeate the left have allowed for a far-right resurgence. Cornel West asserted that discourse on racial, gender and sexual orientation identity was "crucial" and "indispensable", but emphasized that it "must be connected to a moral integrity and deep political solidarity that hones in on a financialized form of predatory capitalism. A capitalism that is killing the planet, poor people, working people here and abroad." Historian Gary Gerstle writes that identity politics and multiculturalism thrived in the neoliberal era precisely because these movements did not threaten capital accumulation, and over the same period "pressure on capitalist elites and their supporters to compromise with the working class was vanishing." The ideological space to oppose capitalism shrank with the end of communism, forcing the left to "redefine their radicalism in alternative terms".

Critiques of identity politics have also been expressed by writers such as Eric Hobsbawm, Todd Gitlin, Adolph Reed, Michael Tomasky, Richard Rorty, Michael Parenti, Jodi Dean, Sean Wilentz and philosopher Slavoj Žižek. Hobsbawm, as a Marxist, criticized nationalisms and the principle of national self-determination adopted in many countries after 1919, since in his view national governments are often merely an expression of a ruling class or power, and their proliferation was a source of the wars of the 20th century. Hence, Hobsbawm argues that identity politics, such as queer nationalism, Islamism, Cornish nationalism or Ulster loyalism are just other versions of bourgeois nationalism. The view that identity politics (rooted in challenging racism, sexism, and the like) obscures class inequality is widespread in the United States and other Western nations. This framing ignores how class-based politics are identity politics themselves, according to Jeff Sparrow.

Considering the effectiveness of identity politics for achieving social justice, Kurzwelly raised four main points of critique:[..] an argument for identity politics and strategic essentialism [could be], [f]or example, claims that because racism is real, and that people keep perceiving social race as real (despite scientific rejection of biological races), may justify using racial and other racialising categories to correct social injustices based upon them. Yet, there are several arguments against such a stance: (1) Social essentialism is inherently erroneous so seeking to address social injustices using essentialist thinking perpetuates that error and risks unforeseen consequences (even if motivated by good intentions [...]). (2) Addressing injustices through using essentialist identity categories assumes that people are necessarily underprivileged primarily because of their identity. Even if, in specific contexts, experiences of oppression and exploitation statistically correlate with identity, using identity categories is an imprecise and indirect strategy for addressing their exploitation and oppression. Rather than using fixed identity categories as variables for social justice, one could take account of contextual relative positionality, or use processual variables, both of which would be more precise in assessing relative privilege and capability to seek justice and access rights. (3) Seeking to address injustices on the basis of identities sometimes forces people to adopt and perform an unwanted identity, and to comply with normative expectations about its contents. For example, [...] gender-specific legislation in Argentina forced gender-non-conforming persons to choose between seeking justice and expressing their identity. Similarly, a shift from justice based on fixed categories to justice based on processes might offer a solution. (4) Overall, using essentialist identities in struggles for justice and political change—the strategy of identity politics—stands in an uneasy tension with a politics that prioritises redistribution of means of production and seeks sustained change in economic relations [...].

Intersectional critique 
In her journal article Mapping the Margins: Intersectionality, Identity Politics and Violence against Women of Color, Kimberlé Crenshaw treats identity politics as a process that brings people together based on a shared aspect of their identity. Crenshaw applauds identity politics for bringing African Americans (and other non-white people), gays and lesbians, and other oppressed groups together in community and progress. But she critiques it because "it frequently conflates or ignores intragroup differences." Crenshaw argues that for Black women, at least two aspects of their identity are the subject of oppression: their race and their sex. Thus, although identity politics are useful, we must be aware of the role of intersectionality. Nira Yuval-Davis supports Crenshaw's critiques in Intersectionality and Feminist Politics and explains that "Identities are individual and collective narratives that answer the question 'who am/are I/we?" 

In Mapping the Margins, Crenshaw illustrates her point using the Clarence Thomas/Anita Hill controversy. Anita Hill accused US Supreme Court Justice nominee Clarence Thomas of sexual harassment; Thomas would be the second African American judge on the Supreme Court. Crenshaw argues that Hill was then deemed anti-Black in the movement against racism, and although she came forward on the feminist issue of sexual harassment, she was excluded because when considering feminism, it is the narrative of white middle-class women that prevails. Crenshaw concludes that acknowledging intersecting categories when groups unite on the basis of identity politics is better than ignoring categories altogether.

Examples

Racial and ethnocultural 

Ethnic, religious and racial identity politics dominated American politics in the 19th century, during the Second Party System (1830s–1850s) as well as the Third Party System (1850s–1890s). Racial identity has been the central theme in Southern politics since slavery was abolished.

Similar patterns which have appeared in the 21st century are commonly referenced in popular culture, and are increasingly analyzed in media and social commentary as an interconnected part of politics and society. Both a majority and minority group phenomenon, racial identity politics can develop as a reaction to the historical legacy of race-based oppression of a people as well as a general group identity issue, as "racial identity politics utilizes racial consciousness or the group's collective memory and experiences as the essential framework for interpreting the actions and interests of all other social groups."

Carol M. Swain has argued that non-white ethnic pride and an "emphasis on racial identity politics" is fomenting the rise of white nationalism. Anthropologist Michael Messner has suggested that the Million Man March was an example of racial identity politics in the United States.

Arab identity politics 

Arab identity politics concerns the form of identity-based politics which is derived from the racial or ethnocultural consciousness of the Arabs. In the regionalism of the Arab world and the Middle East, it has a particular meaning in relation to the national and cultural identities of the citizens of non-Arab countries, such as Turkey, Iran and North African countries . In their 2010 Being Arab: Arabism and the Politics of Recognition, academics Christopher Wise and Paul James challenged the view that, in the post-Afghanistan and Iraq invasion era, Arab identity-driven politics were ending. Refuting the view that had "drawn many analysts to conclude that the era of Arab identity politics has passed", Wise and James examined its development as a viable alternative to Islamic fundamentalism in the Arab world.

According to Marc Lynch, the post-Arab Spring era has seen increasing Arab identity politics, which is "marked by state-state rivalries as well as state-society conflicts". Lynch believes this is creating a new Arab Cold War, no longer characterized by Sunni-Shia sectarian divides but by a reemergent Arab identity in the region. Najla Said has explored her lifelong experience with Arab identity politics in her book Looking for Palestine.

Asian-American identity politics 

In the political realm of the United States, according to Jane Junn and Natalie Masuoka, the possibilities which exist for an Asian American vote are built upon the assumption that those Americans who are broadly categorized as Asians share a sense of racial identity, and this group consciousness has political consequences. However, the belief in the existence of a monolithic Asian American bloc has been challenged because populations are diverse in terms of national origin and language—no one group is predominant—and scholars suggest that these many diverse groups favor groups which share their distinctive national origin over any belief in the existence of a pan-ethnic racial identity. According to the 2000 Consensus, more than six national origin groups are classified collectively as Asian American, and these include: Chinese (23%), Filipino (18%), Asian Indian (17%), Vietnamese (11%), Korean (11%), and Japanese (8%), along with an “other Asian” category (12%). In addition, the definitions which are applied to racial categories in the United States are uniquely American constructs that Asian American immigrants may not adhere to upon entry to the United States.

Jun and Masuoka find that in comparison to blacks, the Asian American identity is more latent, and racial group consciousness is more susceptible to the surrounding context.

Black feminist identity politics 

Black feminist identity politics concern the identity-based politics derived from the lived experiences of struggles and oppression faced by Black women.

In 1977, the Combahee River Collective (CRC) Statement argued that black women struggled with facing their oppression due to the sexism present within the Civil Rights Movement and the racism present within second-wave feminism. This statement—in which the CRC coined the term "identity politics"—gave black women in the U.S. a political foothold—both within radical movements and at large—from which they could confront the oppression they were facing. The CRC also claimed to expand upon the prior feminist adage that "the personal is political," pointing to their own consciousness-raising sessions, centering of black speech, and communal sharing of experiences of oppression as practices that expanded the phrase's scope. As mentioned earlier K. Crenshaw, claims that the oppression of black women is illustrated in two different directions: race and sex.

In 1988, Deborah K. King coined the term Multiple jeopardy, theory that expands on how factors of oppression are all interconnected. King suggested that the identities of gender, class, and race each have an individual prejudicial connotation, which has an incremental effect on the inequity of which one experiences

In 1991, Nancie Caraway explained from a white feminist perspective that the politics of black women had to be comprehended by broader feminist movements in the understanding that the different forms of oppression that black women face (via race and gender) are interconnected, presenting a compound of oppression (Intersectionality).

Hispanic/Latino identity politics 

According to Leonie Huddy, Lilliana Mason, and S. Nechama Horwitz, the majority of Latinos in the United States identity with the Democratic Party. Latinos' Democratic proclivities can be explained by: ideological policy preferences and an expressive identity based on the defense of Latino identity and status, with a strong support for the latter explanation hinged on an analysis of the 2012 Latino Immigrant National Election Study and American National Election Study focused on Latino immigrants and citizens respectively. When perceiving pervasive discrimination against Latinos and animosity from the Republican party, a strong partisanship preference further intensified, and in return, increased Latino political campaign engagement.

Indian caste 

In India, castes play a role in electoral politics, government jobs and affirmative actions.

Māori identity politics 

Due to somewhat competing tribe-based versus pan-Māori concepts, there is both an internal and external utilization of Māori identity politics in New Zealand. Projected outwards, Māori identity politics has been a disrupting force in the politics of New Zealand and post-colonial conceptions of nationhood. Its development has also been explored as causing parallel ethnic identity developments in non-Māori populations. Academic Alison Jones, in her co-written Tuai: A Traveller in Two Worlds, suggests that a form of Māori identity politics, directly oppositional to Pākehā (white New Zealanders), has helped provide a "basis for internal collaboration and a politics of strength".

A 2009, Ministry of Social Development journal identified Māori identity politics, and societal reactions to it, as the most prominent factor behind significant changes in self-identification from the 2006 New Zealand census.

Muslim identity politics 

Since the 1970s, the interaction of religion and politics has been associated with the rise of Islamist movements in the Middle East. Salwa Ismail posits that the Muslim identity is related to social dimensions such as gender, class, and lifestyles (Intersectionality), thus, different Muslims occupy different social positions in relation to the processes of globalization. Not all uniformly engage in the construction of Muslim identity, and they do not all apply to a monolithic Muslim identity.

The construction of British Muslim identity politics is marked with Islamophobia; Jonathan Brit suggests that political hostility toward the Muslim "other" and the reification of an overarching identity that obscures and denies cross-cutting collective identities or existential individuality are charges made against an assertive Muslim identity politics in Britain. In addition, because Muslim identity politics is seen as internally/externally divisive and therefore counterproductive, as well as the result of manipulation by religious conservatives and local/national politicians, the progressive policies of the anti-racist left have been outflanked. Brit sees the segmentation that divided British Muslims amongst themselves and with the anti-racist alliance in Britain as a consequence of patriarchal, conservative mosque-centered leadership.

A Le Monde/IFOP poll in January 2011 conducted in France and Germany found that a majority felt Muslims are "scattered improperly"; an analyst for IFOP said the results indicated something "beyond linking immigration with security or immigration with unemployment, to linking Islam with a threat to identity".

White identity politics 

In 1998, political scientists Jeffrey Kaplan and Leonard Weinberg predicted that, by the late 20th-century, a "Euro-American radical right" would promote a trans-national white identity politics, which would invoke populist grievance narratives and encourage hostility against non-white peoples and multiculturalism. In the United States, mainstream news has identified Donald Trump's presidency as a signal of increasing and widespread utilization of white identity politics within the Republican Party and political landscape. Journalists Michael Scherer and David Smith have reported on its development since the mid-2010s.

Ron Brownstein believed that President Trump uses "White Identity Politics" to bolster his base and that this would ultimately limit his ability to reach out to non-White American voters for the 2020 United States presidential election. A four-year Reuters and Ipsos analysis concurred that "Trump's brand of white identity politics may be less effective in the 2020 election campaign." Alternatively, examining the same poll, David Smith has written that "Trump’s embrace of white identity politics may work to his advantage" in 2020. During the Democratic primaries, presidential candidate Pete Buttigieg publicly warned that the president and his administration were using white identity politics, which he said was the most divisive form of identity politics. Columnist Reihan Salam writes that he is not convinced that Trump uses "white identity politics" given the fact that he still has significant support from liberal and moderate Republicans – who are more favorable toward immigration and the legalization of undocumented immigrants – but believes that it could become a bigger issue as whites become a minority and assert their rights like other minority groups. Salam also states that an increase in "white identity" politics is far from certain given the very high rates of intermarriage and the historical example of the once Anglo-Protestant cultural majority embracing a more inclusive white cultural majority which included Jews, Italians, Poles, Arabs, and Irish.

Columnist Ross Douthat has argued that it has been important to American politics since the Richard Nixon-era of the Republican Party, and historian Nell Irvin Painter has analyzed Eric Kaufmann's thesis that the phenomenon is caused by immigration-derived racial diversity, which reduces the white majority, and an "anti-majority adversary culture". Writing in Vox, political commentator Ezra Klein believes that demographic change has fueled the emergence of white identity politics.

Gender 
Gender identity politics is an approach that views politics, both in practice and as an academic discipline, as having a gendered nature and that gender is an identity that influences how people think. Politics has become increasingly gender political as formal structures and informal 'rules of the game' have become gendered. How institutions affect men and women differently are starting to be analysed in more depth as gender will affect institutional innovation.

Women's Identity Politics in the United States 
Scholars of social movements and democratic theorists disagree on whether identity politics weaken women's social movements and undermine their influence on public policy or have reverse effects. S. Laurel Weldon argues that when marginalized groups organize around an intersectional social location, knowledge about the social group is generated, feelings of affiliation between group members are strengthened, and the movement's agenda becomes more representative. Specifically for the United States, Weldon suggests that organizing women by race strengthens these movements and improves government responsiveness to both violence against women of color and women in general.

References

Further reading 
 Mike Gonzales. 2018. "It Is Time to Debate—and End—Identity Politics". The Heritage Foundation.
 Christopher T. Stout. 2020. The Case for Identity Politics: Polarization, Demographic Change, and Racial Appeals. University of Virginia Press.

External links

Initiative on Religion in International Affairs at Harvard
"Identity politics", Stanford Encyclopedia of Philosophy, 16 July 2002
Joan Mandel. "How Political Is the Personal?: Identity Politics, Feminism and Social Change", University of Maryland, Baltimore County
"A Marxist Critiques Identity Politics". Seattle Weekly. 25 April 2017.
"Identity Politics Can Only Get Us So Far". Jacobin. 3 August 2017.
"Why identity politics benefits the right more than the left". The Guardian. 14 July 2018.

 
Intersectionality
Human rights
Political terminology
Majority–minority relations